Richard Vernon Moore Sr. (November 20, 1906 – January 2, 1994) was an American educator, who served as the third president of Bethune-Cookman College in Daytona Beach, Florida (1947–75).

Moore was born on November 20, 1906, in Quincy, Florida. He attended elementary and junior schools in Quincy before receiving his high school training at Georgia Normal and Agricultural College. In 1932 he graduated with a Bachelor of Arts from Knoxville College, Tennessee. He went on to a Masters from Atlanta University in 1944. Moore commenced his career as an instructor of Social Studies and Coach of Athletics at Pinellas High School in Clearwater, Florida (1932–34), after which he was appointed the principal of Union Academy in Tarpon Springs, Florida (1934–37), then principal of Booker T. Washington High School in Pensacola, Florida (1944–45) and Florida's first African-American Supervisor of Secondary Schools for Negros.

Moore was appointed president of Bethune-Cookman in 1947. On June 30, 1975, Moore retired as president of the college, during his 28-year tenure, the college grew from 400 to 1,200 students (whilst maintaining an 18:1 faculty student ratio), tripled the number of buildings to 25 (with the construction of the Heyn Chapel (1961), Helen Kottle Memorial Classroom building (1964), Lefevre Residence Hall (1966), Charles Parlin Student Center (1966), Swisher Library (1970), and Ja-Flo Davis Residence Hall (1972), increased its endowment by $800,000, was accredited by the Southern Association of Colleges and Schools in 1970, and joined the United Negro College Fund.

Moore was awarded honorary doctoral degrees from fourteen different universities, including Edward Waters College (1948), Knoxville College (1950), Morris Brown College (1969), Syracuse University (1969), Claflin College (1969), Jacksonville University (1970), Ohio Northern University (1971), Florida Institute of Technology (1972), Florida International University (1972), Bethune-Cookman College (1973), Rust College (1974), Florida Southern College (1975), Florida Atlantic University (1975) and University of Florida (1983).

He died on January 2, 1994, and is buried on the Bethune-Cookman campus. There has been a Richard V. Moore Legacy Society at the college.

Bethune-Cookman's 3,000-seat multi-purpose arena, Moore Gymnasium, is named after him. In 2000 he was honored with the designation as a Great Floridian, and his memorial plaque is located in the front of the Richard V. Moore Community Center, Daytona Beach, Florida.

Personal 
Moore married Beauford Jones in 1934 and they had nine children, five boys and four girls.

References

1906 births
1994 deaths
African-American educators
Knoxville College alumni
Bethune–Cookman University people
Albany State University alumni
People from Quincy, Florida
People from Daytona Beach, Florida
African-American Methodists
Atlanta University alumni
Heads of universities and colleges in the United States
American academic administrators
African-American schoolteachers
African-American history of Florida
20th-century Methodists